Krasny Khutor is a rural locality (a settlement) in Makarovsky Selsoviet Rural Settlement, Kurchatovsky District, Kursk Oblast, Russia. Population:

Geography 
The settlement is located 62 km from the Russia–Ukraine border, 48.5 km west of Kursk, 14.5 km north-west of the district center – the town Kurchatov, 5.5 km from the selsoviet center – Makarovka.

 Climate
Krasny Khutor has a warm-summer humid continental climate (Dfb in the Köppen climate classification).

Transport 
Krasny Khutor is located 40 km from the federal route  Crimea Highway, 11.5 km from the road of regional importance  (Kursk – Lgov – Rylsk – border with Ukraine), 15 km from the road  (Lgov – Konyshyovka), 5 km from the road of intermunicipal significance  (38K-017 – Nikolayevka – Shirkovo), 5 km from the road  (38N-362 – Makarovka – Lgov), 12 km from the nearest railway station Lukashevka (railway line Lgov I — Kursk).

The rural locality is situated 54.5 km from Kursk Vostochny Airport, 142 km from Belgorod International Airport and 257 km from Voronezh Peter the Great Airport.

References

Notes

Sources

Rural localities in Kurchatovsky District, Kursk Oblast